The Yeongjong Bridge(영종대교) is a self-anchored suspension double-deck road-rail bridge located in  Incheon, South Korea, linking Yeongjong Island to the Korean mainland. The bridge is part of the Incheon International Airport Expressway and was completed in 2000.

The main suspension bridge has two decks and carries motor vehicles and AREX train.

See also 
 Transportation in South Korea
 List of bridges in South Korea
 Incheon International Airport
 Incheon Bridge

References

External links 

Bridges in Incheon
Suspension bridges in South Korea
Self-anchored suspension bridges
Bridges completed in 2000
Road-rail bridges
Incheon International Airport
Cross-sea bridges in Asia
AREX